The New Caledonia flying fox (Pteropus vetulus) is a species of flying fox in the family Pteropodidae. It is endemic to New Caledonia.  The habitat of the species is highly fragmented, and possibly decreasing due to deforestation.  Other threats such as hunting are as yet unquantified.

References

Pteropus
Bats of Oceania
Endemic fauna of New Caledonia
Mammals of New Caledonia
Mammals described in 1863
Taxonomy articles created by Polbot